The RP20BD is a diesel-electric switcher locomotive built by Railpower Technologies.  It is a "genset" locomotive, having three engine-generator sets.

The engines are computer controlled, with the computer stopping and starting engines on a rotating basis, as required to produce the horsepower needed at any given moment.

RP20BDs are rebuilt from older locomotives such as the General Electric Dash 7 series and EMD General Purpose series.

References

B-B locomotives
Diesel-electric locomotives of the United States
Railpower locomotives
EPA Tier 2-compliant locomotives of the United States
Rebuilt locomotives
Standard gauge locomotives of the United States
Railway locomotives introduced in 2008